Carlotta Guiducci (born 1977) is an Italian bio-engineer. Her research is invested in bio-molecular analysis based on lab-on-a-chip devices. She is an Associate Professor at EPFL (École polytechnique fédérale de Lausanne) and head of the Laboratory of Life Sciences Electronics located at EPFL's Lausanne campus.

Career 
Guiducci studied electrical and electronics engineering at University of Bologna and received her Master's degree in 2001. In 2005, she gained a PhD degree in electrical engineering from Department of Electronics, Computer Sciences and Systems (DEIS) at University of Bologna for her work on electronic biosensors and the development of molecular sensors. She  joined the Nanobiophysics Laboratory at ParisTech as postdoctoral research fellow in 2005. In 2007, she returned to University of Bologna as research fellow.

In 2009, she became a faculty member of the Institute of Bioengineering at the School of Life Sciences at EPFL first as an Assistant Professor, and in 2018, she was promoted as Associate Professor. She is the SwissUp Foundation chair, and the founder and head of Laboratory of Life Sciences Electronics.

Research 
Guiducci's research centers on biomolecular analysis based on micro-fluidic systems, and on novel personalized medicine approaches. She is specialized in the integration and interfacing of analytic lab-on-a-chip devices that incorporate full-fledged laboratory equipment on a miniature scale.  She is developing miniaturized portable devices for DNA-based analytics, high-throughput cytometry and single-cell analysis.

Selected works

References

External links 
 
 Publications listed on Publons
 Website of the Laboratory of Life Sciences Electronics

1977 births
Living people
University of Bologna alumni
Academic staff of the École Polytechnique Fédérale de Lausanne
Italian women scientists
Italian engineers
Italian women engineers